Sulphur orange tip may refer to:

 Colotis auxo, a butterfly endemic to Transvaal and Botswana
 Colotis aurora, a butterfly of Africa and Asia

Animal common name disambiguation pages